Golbahar-e Sheykh Miri (also Romanized as Golbahār-e Sheykh Mīrī; also known as Eslāmābād-e Sheykh Mīrī) is a village in Borborud-e Gharbi Rural District, in the Central District of Aligudarz County, Lorestan Province, Iran. At the 2006 census, its population was 85, in 17 families.

References 

Towns and villages in Aligudarz County